Lee Sang-min (born November 1965) is a South Korean lawyer and a former judge. He is currently Minister of the Interior and Safety in the Cabinet of Yoon Suk-yeol.

Career 
After the 2022 Seoul Halloween crowd crush, he offered an official apology to the victims. On 9 February 2023, he was impeached by the National Assembly over the disaster, and was succeeded by his deputy Han Chang-seob in an acting capacity.

References 

1965 births
Living people
People from Iksan
Seoul National University School of Law alumni
Korea University alumni
Republic of Korea Air Force personnel
Interior ministers of South Korea
20th-century South Korean lawyers
21st-century South Korean lawyers